General elections were held in Turkey on 26 March 1939. The Republican People's Party was the only party in the country at the time. Voter turnout was reported to be 77.8%.

Electoral system
The elections were held under the Ottoman electoral law passed in 1908, which provided for a two-stage process. In the first stage, voters elected secondary electors (one for the first 750 voters in a constituency, then one for every additional 500 voters). In the second stage the secondary electors elected the members of the Turkish Grand National Assembly.

References

Turkey
Turkey
1939 elections in Turkey
General elections in Turkey
One-party elections